Schmalkalde is a river of Thuringia, Germany. It flows through the town Schmalkalden, and joins the Werra near Wernshausen.

See also
List of rivers of Thuringia

Rivers of Thuringia
Rivers of Germany